"Do You Love Me" is a song written by Vincent Pontare, and recorded by Amanda Jenssen on her 2008 album Killing My Darlings. It was also released as a single on 23 January the same year.

She performed the song during the 2008 Grammis Awards ceremony. The song became the 20th most successful of Trackslistan that year.

The song also charted at Svensktoppen for 10 weeks between 3 February-6 April 2008 before leaving the chart. It peaked at number two.

The song has been used in scenes of US TV series Privileged.

Charts

Weekly charts

Year-end charts

References 

2008 singles
Amanda Jenssen songs
English-language Swedish songs
Number-one singles in Sweden
Songs written by Vincent Pontare
2008 songs